John Rushton may refer to:

 J. Philippe Rushton (1943–2012), British-born Canadian psychology professor
 John Rushton (priest) (1798–1868), Archdeacon of Manchester